HR 8526, also known as HD 212168, is the primary of a triple star located in the southern circumpolar constellation Octans.

This is a Sun-like star with a stellar classification of G0 V. It has 105% the mass of the Sun and 117% its girth. HD 212168 has a similar age to the Sun; the former is 4.7 billion years old while the latter is 4.6 billion years old.

It has a combined mass 76% that of the Sun and take roughly 11 years to orbit each other. Spectral classifications for this star vary from G0-V to K2V. The G0 class has been used as an argument that the two visible components form a purely optical pair, but this has been dismissed as mis-identification or contamination and that the actual spectral class is early or mid K.

DENIS J222644.3-750342 is a cool M8 red dwarf located 264 arcseconds away from HR 8526.  In 2012, J.A. Caballero identified it as a companion to the AB system, making it a quadruple star system.

References

G-type main-sequence stars
M-type main-sequence stars
Octans
Octantis, 72
8526
CD-75 01241
212168
110712
High-proper-motion stars